Major (Retd.) Mohammad Quamrul Islam is a Bangladesh Nationalist Party politician and a former Jatiya Sangsad member representing the  Dhaka-5 constituency in the 5th, 6th and 8th  parliament. He  was also a former state minister for expatriate welfare and overseas employment ministry, and also shipping ministry in the Second Khaleda Cabinet.

Career
Islam served in the Bangladesh Army and retired with the rank of Major.

During the 2007-2008 Caretaker Government, Islam confessed to corruption to the Truth and Accountability Commission.

References

Living people
Bangladesh Nationalist Party politicians
Bangladesh Army officers
State Ministers of Expatriates' Welfare and Overseas Employment (Bangladesh)
State Ministers of Shipping
5th Jatiya Sangsad members
6th Jatiya Sangsad members
8th Jatiya Sangsad members
Year of birth missing (living people)
Place of birth missing (living people)